Salgar is a surname. Notable people with the surname include:

Consuelo Salgar (1928–2002), Colombian journalist, advertising executive, media entrepreneur, and politician
Eustorgio Salgar (1831–1885), Colombian lawyer and general